The Liria Palace (Spanish: Palacio de Liria) is a neoclassical palace in Madrid, Spain. It is the Madrid residence of the Dukes of Alba.

History
Built around 1770 to a design by the architect Ventura Rodríguez, it was commissioned by James Fitz-James Stuart, 3rd Duke of Berwick, who was also the 3rd Duke of Liria (hence the name of the palace). In the early 19th century it passed to the inheritance of the House of Alba. On 19 March 1833, a fire broke out at Liria Palace, destroying part of its archive. Eugénie de Montijo, last empress consort of the French, died here in exile in 1920.

All but the facades were destroyed during the Spanish Civil War. It was subsequently rebuilt by Jacobo Fitz-James Stuart, 17th Duke of Alba and his daughter Cayetana Fitz-James Stuart, 18th Duchess of Alba who was head of the House of Alba from 1955 to 2014. The British architect Edwin Lutyens had been commissioned by the 17th Duke to provide designs for the interior, and the reconstruction, although it took place after the architect´s death, made use of them.

Although the 18th Duchess of Alba's official residence was the Liria Palace, in later life she preferred the Palacio de las Dueñas in Seville, where she died. Her son and heir Carlos Fitz-James Stuart, 14th Duke of Huéscar resides at the Liria Palace.

Art collection
The building is protected under Spanish heritage law as a listed monument, and some of the moveable art works it contains are also protected as Properties of Cultural Interest.

The palace contains a remarkable private collection of European art. The collection includes:
 Paintings by Pietro Perugino, Titian, Palma il Vecchio, El Greco, Anthonis Mor, Goya, Murillo, Zurbarán, Rembrandt, Jacob van Ruisdael, Ribera, Rubens, Francesco Guardi, Ingres, Joshua Reynolds, Courbet, Henri Fantin-Latour, Eugène Boudin and Joaquin Sorolla. One important work by Fra Angelico (Virgin of the pomegranate) was sold to the Prado Museum in 2016. 
 Engravings by Dürer, Mantegna, Lucas van Leyden and Van Dyck. 
 Sculptures: marble and bronze figures from the Roman Empire to the neoclassical period, including one portrait of Gioacchino Rossini by Lorenzo Bartolini.
 Archeological finds and decorative arts: Greek painted ceramics, old armor and weapons, 18th-century tapestries from the Gobelins Manufactory, Sèvres porcelains and empire style furniture.

Exhibitions
To see the art collection in situ, it was previously necessary to make an application, a process which involved being placed on a waiting list. 2019 saw the introduction of a speedier, on-line booking process for visits to the palace.

Works on loan
Some works were put on exhibition at the Cibeles Palace in Madrid in 2012.
From September 2015 to January 2016 there was an exhibition of works belonging to the House of Alba, including items from the Liria Palace, in the Meadows Museum, Dallas. Another exhibition, titled Treasures from the House of Alba: 500 Years of Art and Collecting and containing over 130 items, was held at the Frist Center for the Visual Arts in Nashville, TN from February 5 to May 1, 2016.

Archive
The library of the Palace contains an extensive archive with royal, nobiliary and colonial documents. Around 4,000 of these documents were lost during the fires that affected the Palace in 1833 and in 1936. Among the documents housed at the Palace are more than 9,000 books (including one first-edition copy of Don Quixote) and manuscripts (including the Alba Bible, Papal bulls from the Vatican, the last will of King Philip II of Spain and letters by Christopher Columbus, Titian and Rousseau).

Notes

External links

https://www.palaciodeliria.com/

House of Alba
Houses completed in 1770
Palaces in Madrid
Neoclassical palaces
Works of Edwin Lutyens
1770 establishments in Spain
Buildings and structures in Universidad neighborhood, Madrid